Emmanuel Kwaku Yeboah (born 25 February 2003) is a Ghanaian professional footballer who plays as a winger for Liga I club CFR Cluj.

Career

Young Apostles
Yeboah started his senior career with Ghanaian team Young Apostles in 2021, which he left at the start of the next year.

CFR Cluj
Initially assigned to the reserve team, Yeboah made his debut for CFR Cluj in a 1–0 Liga I victory over Rapid București on 16 July 2022. He became a first-team regular under manager Dan Petrescu, scoring three goals in 16 league appearances by the end of the calendar year.

On 5 January 2023, CFR announced that a move of Yeboah to Slavia Prague fell through after a meniscus issue was reportedly found during his medical; the Czech team then proposed a one-year loan with an option to buy instead of a full transfer, which CFR declined.

Career statistics

Club

Honours
CFR Cluj
Supercupa României runner-up: 2022

References

External links

2003 births
Living people
Footballers from Accra
Ghanaian footballers
Association football wingers
Liga I players
CFR Cluj players
Ghanaian expatriate footballers
Expatriate footballers in Romania